Patradevi ( Konkani-Potradeo) is a town in the Pernem taluk of Goa on the Goa-Maharashtra border. The Patradevi checkpost is located in this town.

There is a private bus service to Netarde.

See also
Pernem
Mapusa
Bicholim
Savantwadi
Banda

Cities and towns in North Goa district